Nation is the fifth studio album by deathcore band Dr. Acula, released on June 19, 2012.

Track listing

Personnel
Dr. Acula
Tyler Guida – vocals
Casey Carrano –  vocals
Bill Graffeo – guitar
Ricky Ostolaza – guitar
Kevin Graffeo – bass
Jesse Ciappa – drums

Production
Jeremy Comitas - composer, engineer, mastering, mixing, producer
Ricky Ostolaza - co-production
William Control - narrator
Paul Cutri - mastering
Doublej - art direction, layout
Mike C. Hardcore - illustration

References

2012 albums
Dr. Acula (band) albums
Victory Records albums